College Street United Church is a United Church of Canada church at the corner of College and Bathurst Streets in Toronto, Ontario, Canada. As of 1990 the church is part of the same structure as The Channel Club Condo at 456 College Street.

The large church was built in 1885 as College Street Presbyterian and could hold 1200 worshippers, under founding (1874) minister Alexander Gilray (1874-1915), and Robert Balmer Cochrane (1915-1925). In 1925, this congregation voted to join the United Church, and was the site that June of the 51st and final General Assembly of the originally constituted Presbyterian Church in Canada before a majority of congregations of that founding denomination voted to enter the United Church of Canada. Over time attendance fell and it ran into financial difficulties and fell into disrepair.

In the late 1980s, despite its heritage status, it was decided to demolish much of the church, renovate the bell tower, and rebuild in 1990. The new building is 8 stories tall with an 89 suite condominium on top of the Church. The architects of the new building worked to have it be as similar to the old church as possible, copying many of its architectural elements.

See also
List of United Church of Canada churches in Toronto

References

"Beleaguered church is reincarnated in new condominium." John Allemang. The Globe and Mail. Jun 25, 1988. pg. A.10
"Saving church tower a sad irony." Christopher Hume Toronto Star. Mar 24, 1990. pg. J.1

External links

Official site

United Church of Canada churches in Toronto
Churches completed in 1885
Gothic Revival architecture in Toronto
Gothic Revival church buildings in Canada
19th-century churches in Canada